Woh Phir Aayegi is a 1988 Hindi-language Indian horror film directed by B.R. Ishara, starring Rajesh Khanna and Farha Naaz in lead roles. It was remake of Malayalam film Lisa. This film was silver jubilee hit in year 1988.

Plot 
The film depicts the fight of Raju to free his wife Aarti from the evil spirit of Asha, who seeks revenge on her killers.

Cast 
Rajesh Khanna as Raju
Farha Naaz as Aarthi
Moon Moon Sen as Asha
Shekhar Suman as CID Inspector Ratan
Javed Jaffrey as Mukesh
Archana Puran Singh
Ashalata Wabgaonkar
Satyen Kappu
Iftekhar
Beena Banerjee
Dan Dhanoa
Yunus Parvez
Lilliput
Tiku Talsania
Padma Chavan

Soundtrack 

Lyrics: Sameer

References

External links 
 

1988 films
1980s Hindi-language films
Films scored by Anand–Milind
Indian horror films
1988 horror films
Films directed by B. R. Ishara
Hindi-language horror films
[[Category:Hindi remakes of Malayalam films Mm